Chanel College may refer to several schools named for Peter Chanel:

 Chanel College (Gladstone), in Gladstone, Queensland, Australia
 Chanel College (Dublin), in Coolock, Dublin, Ireland
 Chanel College (Geelong), in Geelong, Victoria, Australia
 Chanel College, Masterton, in Masterton, New Zealand
 Chanel College, Moamoa, in Moamoa, Samoa

See also
 St Peter Chanel School (disambiguation)